Jennifer Michelle Lee (née Rebecchi; October 22, 1971) is an American screenwriter, film director, and chief creative officer of Walt Disney Animation Studios. She is best known as the writer and director of Frozen and its sequel Frozen II, the former of which earned her an Academy Award for Best Animated Feature. Lee is the first female director of a Walt Disney Animation Studios feature film and the first female director of a feature film that earned more than $1 billion in gross box office revenue. She has won an Academy Award, a BAFTA  Award and an Annie Award, and has been nominated for one more BAFTA Award and two more Annie Awards.

Early life
Jennifer Michelle Lee was born on October 22, 1971 to Linda Lee and Saverio Rebecchi, who were living in Barrington, Rhode Island at the time; after their divorce, Lee and her older sister, Amy who is an English teacher, lived with their mother in East Providence, Rhode Island.  Both Lee and her older sister graduated from East Providence High School and the University of New Hampshire. Lee earned a bachelor's degree in English in 1992 and went to New York City, where she worked as a graphic artist in publishing; she designed audiobooks for Random House.  As an adult, she began using her mother's maiden name, Lee, in a professional capacity and in January 1995, legally changed her last name from Rebecchi to Lee.

Career
Lee graduated from Columbia University School of the Arts' Film Program with an MFA in film in 2005. While at Columbia, she won several awards for excellence in screenwriting and gave birth to her daughter.

Her script for The Round Up was a quarter-finalist in the Nicholl Fellowships in Screenwriting competition in 2009 and was subsequently optioned by Appian Way Productions.

In March 2011, Phil Johnston, a former classmate at Columbia, called Lee to ask her to join him at Disney Animation in Burbank to help him write Wreck-It Ralph. What was supposed to be a temporary eight-week writing gig eventually turned into a much longer commitment. First, she was asked to stay on until Ralph was finished. She then became involved with Frozen, initially as screenwriter and later as co-director with Chris Buck. When Lee was brought on board, she helped transition the film from an action-adventure to "more musical, with more comedy." She worked closely with the songwriters (Robert Lopez and Kristen Anderson-Lopez) in the writing of the script. Frozen gave her the opportunity to celebrate "wild and wonderful" girls like her childhood self, and her daughter, Agatha. It was also the highest-earning film with a female director in terms of domestic earnings, until surpassed by Warner Bros.' Wonder Woman.

On May 17, 2014, Lee delivered the commencement address to the class of 2014 at her alma mater, the University of New Hampshire.  She revealed that she had struggled with self-doubt while growing up, and then in April of her junior year of college, her boyfriend was killed in a boating accident, after which she felt "no doubt, only grief ... and for a brief moment ... [knew] better than to waste a second doubting."  Years later, that memory would help her overcome her initial doubt over whether she was good enough to apply to Columbia. At Columbia, Johnston recognized she was talented but insecure, and one day asked her to "promise ... that you'll leave it out of your work, just know that you're good enough and move on."  She concluded: "If I learned one thing it is that self-doubt is one of the most destructive forces. It makes you defensive instead of open, reactive instead of active. Self-doubt is consuming and cruel and my hope today is that we can all collectively agree to ban it ... Please know, from here on out, you are enough and dare I say, more than enough."  UNH then awarded her the honorary degree of Doctor of Humane Letters.

In September 2014, it was announced that Lee and Buck would co-direct a short film featuring the Frozen characters called Frozen Fever. It was released in March 2015. Lee was one of several Disney writers and directors who received credit for "Creative Leadership" on the 2014 film Big Hero 6 and the 2016 film Moana, and received screen credit as one of the writers who developed the story for the 2016 film Zootopia.

In August 2014, Variety reported that Lee's next project after Frozen would be an adaptation of Madeleine L'Engle's 1962 novel A Wrinkle in Time. After the news broke, Lee tweeted: "Been in love with the book for over 30 years. Writing this script means the world to me." Catherine Hand, the executive producer of the 2003 television film version, and Jim Whitaker produced for Disney, and Ava DuVernay directed the film, based on Lee's script. A Wrinkle in Time was released in March 2018.

On March 12, 2015, Disney announced that Lee and Buck would co-direct a full length sequel to Frozen.

In June 2018, Lee was named the chief creative officer of Walt Disney Animation Studios, following John Lasseter's departure from Disney. Lee is also set to write and produce a film titled The Way Between, for Tooley Entertainment, with Kyra Sedgwick set to direct.

As of September 2022 Lee is writing the screenplay for Disney's animated film Wish, scheduled for release in November 2023.

Personal life
Lee married Robert Joseph Monn on May 30, 1999, at the Rhode Island Country Club (they later divorced). They have a daughter, Agatha Lee Monn (born in 2003), who voices pre-teen Anna for the middle verse of "Do You Want to Build a Snowman?" in Frozen. Lee and her daughter now live in the San Fernando Valley in Los Angeles County, California.

In November 2019, Lee confirmed that she is in a relationship with actor Alfred Molina. They were married in August 2021.

Filmography

Films

Shorts and series

Other credits

Accolades

References

External links

Living people
1971 births
Place of birth missing (living people)
American chief executives in the media industry
American film studio executives
American women chief executives
American women film directors
American women animators
American women screenwriters
American animated film directors
Animation screenwriters
Annie Award winners
Columbia University School of the Arts alumni
Directors of Best Animated Feature Academy Award winners
Disney executives
Walt Disney Animation Studios people
People from East Providence, Rhode Island
University of New Hampshire alumni
Screenwriters from Rhode Island
Film directors from Rhode Island